Minuscule 234 (in the Gregory-Aland numbering), δ 365 (Soden), is a Greek minuscule manuscript of the New Testament, on parchment. It is dated by a colophon to the year 1278. It has liturgical books and marginalia.

Description 

The codex contains entire text of the New Testament (except Apocalypse), on 315 thick parchment leaves (size ). The text is written in two columns per page, 35 lines per page, in black ink, the capital letters in red. The order of books is unusual, the same as in codex 51: Acts, Pauline epistles, Catholic epistles, Gospels.

The text of the Gospels has also a division according to the smaller Ammonian Sections (Matthew 359, Mark 241, Luke 342, John 232), with references to the Eusebian Canons.

The text has many corrections.

Text 

The Greek text of the codex is a representative of the Byzantine text-type. Aland did not place it in any Category.
According to the Claremont Profile Method it represents the textual family Kx in Luke 1 and Luke 20. In Luke 10 no profile was made. It belongs to the textual cluster 74.

History 

The manuscript is one of several copies written by Theodore Hagiopetrites (as codex 74, 412, and others). It was bought at Venice by Friedrich Rostgaard in 1699. It was examined by Hensler, Birch, Delitzsch, Graux, and C. R. Gregory (1891).

It is currently housed at the Det Kongelige Bibliotek (GkS 1322, 4) at Copenhagen.

See also 

 List of New Testament minuscules
 Biblical manuscript
 Textual criticism

References

Further reading 

 Charles Graux, Notices sommaires des manuscritti grecs de la grande bibliotheque royale de Copenhague, Paris 1879.

Greek New Testament minuscules
12th-century biblical manuscripts
Royal Library, Denmark